The men's quadruple sculls rowing competition at the 1980 Summer Olympics took place at Krylatskoye Sports Complex Canoeing and Rowing Basin, Moscow, Soviet Union. The event was held from 20 to 27 July.

Heats 
Winner of each heat advanced to final. The remaining teams must compete in repechage for the remaining spots in the final.

Heat One

Heat Two

Repechage

Heat One

Heat Two

Finals

Finals A

Finals B

Notes

References 

Rowing at the 1980 Summer Olympics
Men's events at the 1980 Summer Olympics